is a large sports complex located in Higashisumiyoshi-ku, Osaka.  Its facilities include three multipurpose sports stadia, including 50,000-seat Nagai Stadium, a baseball field, Nagai Botanical Garden, which boasts over 1,000 species of trees and flowers, a swimming pool and gymnasium, and a tract of preserved local forest.  It also hosts a large number of cherry trees, and is a popular area for picnics during cherry blossom (Sakura) season in early spring.

Establishments 
Nagai Stadium
Nagai Aid Stadium
Nagai Ball Gall Field (Kincho Stadium)
Nagai Tennis Court
Nagai Sumo Stadium
Nagai Hostel
Nagai Botanical Garden
Osaka Museum of Natural History
Disabled Sports Center
Rubber baseball Stadium

Defunct establishments 
Osaka Central Keirin Stadium
Osaka Racecourse

Access
Tsurugaoka Station (Hanwa Line)
Nagai Station (Hanwa Line, Osaka Municipal Subway Midosuji Line)

External links
Nagai Park 
Nagai Botanical Garden 
Osaka Museum of Natural History 

Parks in Japan
Parks and gardens in Osaka
Buildings and structures in Osaka
Higashisumiyoshi-ku, Osaka